Daniel John Rock (born 26 October 1981) is a former English cricketer.  Rock is a left-handed batsman who fields as a wicket-keeper.  He was born in Ipswich, Suffolk.

Rock made his debut for Suffolk in the 1998 MCCA Knockout Trophy against the Essex Cricket Board.  Rock made 4 further MCCA Knockout Trophy appearances, with his last appearance coming in 2000 against Hertfordshire.  He made no appearances in the Minor Counties Championship for Suffolk, but did make a single List A appearance against the Lancashire Cricket Board in the 2000 NatWest Trophy.  In this match, he scored 7 runs before being run out.

He has previously played Second XI cricket for the Leicestershire, Northamptonshire and Derbyshire Second XI's.

References

External links
Daniel Rock at ESPNcricinfo
Daniel Rock at CricketArchive

1981 births
Living people
Cricketers from Ipswich
English cricketers
Suffolk cricketers